Apollo Records is an ambient-music subdivision of R&S Records of Belgium.

Selected discography
 Apollo Compilation – Volume 1 – File Under Ambient
 Biosphere – Microgravity
 Aphex Twin – Selected Ambient Works 85–92
 In–Existence – Moonwater
 The Irresistible Force – The Irrisistible Force
 Robert Leiner – Visions of the Past
 Biosphere – Patashnik
 The Fires Of Ork – The Fires of Ork
 Locust – Weathered Well
 Jam & Spoon – Tripomatic Fairy Tales 2002
 Tournesol – Kokotsu
 Uzect Plaush – More Beautiful Human Life!
 Apollo 2 – The Divine Compilation
 Cabaret Voltaire – The Conversation
 Locust – Natural Composite
 Sketch – Reasons to Sway
 Manna – Manna
 Sun Electric – 30.7.94 Live
 Locust – Truth is Born of Arguments
 Subsurfing – Frozen Ants
 Locust – Morning Light
 Sun Electric – Present
 Manna – 5:1
 Drum Island – Drum Island
 John Beltran – Moving Through Here
 David Morley – Tilted
 DJ Krush & Toshindri Kondo – Ki–Oku
 Sun Electric – Via Nostra
 Thomas Fehlmann – Good Fridge (Flowing Ninezeronineight)
 Mark Van Hoen – Playing with Time
 Kondo/Bernocchi/Laswell – Charged
 Thomas Fehlmann – OneToThree
 Afronaught – Shapin Fluid
 Dynamoe – Jump Start

See also
 List of record labels
 Apollo Records

References
 http://music.hyperreal.org/labels/apollo/albums_list.html
 https://web.archive.org/web/20141018081839/https://soundcloud.com/urgent-fm-official/nchtschd-episode-034-01-04 (a tribute set for the relaunch containing Aphex Twin,μ-Ziq, Sun Electric, Biosphere and many others)

Belgian record labels
Ambient music record labels